FELDA LB Johnson or Kampung LB Johnson is a settlement village in Seremban District, Negeri Sembilan, Malaysia. Formerly known as "LKTP Labu Jaya", opened by the first group of settlers in 1963. The FELDA settlement was named after former President of the United States, Lyndon Baines Johnson, who visited LKTP Labu Jaya on 31 October 1966. It was one of the places he visited as part of his trip to Malaysia. After President Johnson's visit, the settlement was renamed FELDA LB Johnson in honour of his visit.
 
(LKTP: Lembaga Kemajuan Tanah Persekutuan term was used before it was changed to Federal Land Development Authority (FELDA)

In 1995, Lembaga Tabung Haji through its property investment arm, TH Properties, offered the 423 settlers to sell their lands. This was done with the consent of then Negeri Sembilan's Menteri Besar, Tan Sri Mohd Isa Abdul Samad. 

Later in 1998, 16 settlers were brought to the court and were made to accept the judgement by imposing Akta Pengambilan Tanah. They were fully compensated in a one-off payment rather whereas the other residents were paid in stages as agreed in their agreement with the THP.

Today, the village is now known as Kampung LB Johnson as it is no longer a FELDA settlement. Its entrance overlooks the route to the new Nilai Polytechnic in Labu, Negeri Sembilan. Institut Aminuddin Baki, Tunku Kurshiah College and few government buildings were built around the area.

The village itself also has a primary school and a mosque both named after Johnson.

References
Felda LBJ reminisce about Johnson's visit - New Straits Times, 21 April 2014

See also
 FELDA Soeharto

Villages in Negeri Sembilan
Federal Land Development Authority settlements